After Hours is the third EP by English metalcore band Glamour of the Kill. It was released on 17 November 2014 after a kickstarter campaign. Glasswerk Magazine called the EP "a slightly grittier affair than the band’s sophomore album, but it seems the four-piece are choosing to stick to their winning formula of pop-rock hooks and 80s-metal-inspired riffage. The EP features guest vocals from Craig Mabbitt of Escape The Fate and Jacoby Shaddix of Papa Roach."

History
Funded via Kickstarter after the band parted ways with their management and record company, the album will be released on 17 November 2014, through Siege of Amida Records.  The single "Out of Control" (featuring Jacoby Shaddix of Papa Roach) was released on 5 October 2014, and was premiered on BBC Radio 1 Rock Show.  Two weeks later, they announced pre-orders for the album.

Glasswerk Magazine stated in a review that "the EP is a slightly grittier affair than the band’s sophomore album, but it seems the four-piece are choosing to stick to their winning formula of pop-rock hooks and 80s-metal-inspired riffage."

Track listing

Personnel

Glamour of the Kill
 Davey Richmond - lead vocals, bass guitar
 Mike Kingswood - guitars, backing vocals
 Chris Gomerson - guitars, backing vocals
 Ben Thomson - drums, backing vocals

Additional Musicians

 Jacoby Shaddix - vocals on "Out of Control"
 Craig Mabbitt - vocals on "Earthquake"

References

2014 EPs
Glamour of the Kill EPs